The 20th Critics' Choice Awards were presented on January 15, 2015 at the Hollywood Palladium, honoring the finest achievements of 2014 filmmaking. The ceremony was broadcast on A&E and hosted by Michael Strahan. The nominees were announced on December 15, 2014.

In recognition of the breadth of her accomplishments in 2014, Jessica Chastain received the first-ever Critics' Choice MVP Award. The honor celebrates "one extraordinary actor for his/her standout work in several movies throughout a single year".

Winners and nominees

Louis XIII Genius Award
Ron Howard

Critics' Choice MVP Award
Jessica Chastain (for The Disappearance of Eleanor Rigby, Interstellar, Miss Julie, and A Most Violent Year)

Lifetime Achievement Award
Kevin Costner

Films by multiple nominations and wins

The following thirty-two films received multiple nominations:

The following four films received multiple awards:

References

External links
 20th Annual Critics' Choice Awards – Winners

Broadcast Film Critics Association Awards
2014 film awards